In celestial mechanics, the Stumpff functions ck(x), developed by Karl Stumpff, are used for analyzing orbits using the universal variable formulation. They are defined by the formula:

for  The series above converges absolutely for all real x.

By comparing the Taylor series expansion of the trigonometric functions sin and cos with c0(x) and c1(x), a relationship can be found:

Similarly, by comparing with the expansion of the hyperbolic functions sinh and cosh we find:

The Stumpff functions satisfy the recurrence relation:

The Stumpff functions can be expressed in terms of the Mittag-Leffler function:

References

Orbits